Eyvan Estakhr (also Romanized as Eyvān Estakhr) is a village in Shirju Posht Rural District, Rudboneh District, Lahijan County, Gilan Province, Iran. According to the 2006 census, its population was 441, in 130 families.

References 

Populated places in Lahijan County